Wangels is a municipality in the district of Ostholstein in Schleswig-Holstein, Germany. It is next to the Baltic Sea and about 100 km away from Hamburg.

Schloß Weissenhaus is located in Wangels.

References

Ostholstein